Unión Santeña  is a corregimiento in Chimán District, Panamá Province, Panama with a population of 920 as of 2010. It was created by Law 5 of January 19, 1998. Its population as of 2000 was 1,023.

References

Corregimientos of Panamá Province